Cake Mania is a series of cooking and time management video games developed and published by Sandlot Games since 2006.

The series is available for PCs, Apple Mac, game consoles, on the web as a Flash game, on Facebook as Cake Mania: Special Delivery, and as a mobile game for cell phones. Cake Mania is also notable for being one of the first top-50 titles available as a free download in an advertising-supported model.

Cake Mania

Cake Mania: Back to the Bakery 
Cake Mania: Back to the Bakery is an expansion to the original Cake Mania. It has slightly different gameplay and features from the original.

After Jill saves her grandparents' bakery, she has to win the Cake Mania Bake-Off contest to send her grandparents on a cruise. Jill has to race against the clock baking sponge, chocolate, strawberry, and blueberry cakes for various business men, grandmas, construction workers, teens, and the usual town people.

Cake Mania 2 
Cake Mania 2 is a sequel to the original Cake Mania. It has different features from the original one, including different locations, slightly different gameplay, new customers, and a new design.

After helping reopen the Evans Bakery, Jill sends her grandparents on a long-overdue cruise and decides to get back to business by helping out her friends.

Cake Mania 3 
Cake Mania 3 is the sequel to Cake Mania 2. New features include mini-games and power-ups as well as the introduction of voice overs for the different storyboards throughout the game.

As Jill prepares for her wedding day, disaster strikes when finds herself bouncing through various time periods in history - from Ancient Egypt and Revolutionary France, to an unknown future where anything is possible - and she must work to find her way back before the ceremony begins.

Cake Mania: Main Street 
Cake Mania: Main Street is the fourth game to be released by Sandlot Games based on the original Cake Mania. New features include the ability to play as Jack, Risha, and Tiny in establishments other than the Evans Bakery.

Newlyweds Jill and Jack return to Jill's hometown of Bakersfield only to discover Jill's favourite spot, Main Street, is all but abandoned thanks to the flashy new mega-mall, Bakersfield Corner. Distraught at the idea of her beloved Main Street's fading life, Jill comes up with a plan to get Main Street business booming again with the help of her baking expertise and the business skills of Jack, Risha, and Tiny.

Cake Mania: Lights, Camera, Action! 
Jill is 8-months pregnant. In the same time, Bakersville is crowded with movie crews. With the help from Jack, she must run a bakery. The rest of her friends are busy with their own business like Risha's new boutique, Gordo's Pizzaria, and Tiny got cast in a horrendous Pride & Prejudice movie.

Cake Mania: To The Max! 
The picture of Oliver and Rose, Jill and Jack Evans' children, are shown in the intro. Jill imagines her teenage life. Jill has gone home. Her grandparents gave their apple to Jill.

References

Cooking video games
IOS games
Puzzle video games
Wii games
Windows games
PlayStation 2 games
PlayStation Portable games
Video game franchises
Video games featuring female protagonists
Time management video games